Maaria-Paattinen (Finnish; S:t Marie-Patis in Swedish) is a ward of Turku, Finland, also known as Ward 9. The ward includes almost half of the city's land area, and is its most sparsely populated district. It is located to the north of the city, and named after Maaria and Paattinen, the two former municipalities from which it was formed after both of them were annexed into Turku.

Maaria-Paattinen is the second smallest ward of Turku by population, with only 8,756 inhabitants. The population increases by 0.95% annually. 22.66% of the ward's population are under 15 years old, while 9.92% are over 65. The ward's linguistic makeup is 95.76% Finnish, 1.29% Swedish, and 2.95% other.

Districts
The ward consists of five districts.

See also

Districts of Turku
Wards of Turku

Wards of Turku